Following is a list of Cajun restaurants:

 Acadia: A New Orleans Bistro, Portland, Oregon
 Biscuit Bitch, Seattle
 Delta Cafe, Portland, Oregon
 Dirty Lettuce, Portland, Oregon
 Eat: An Oyster Bar, Portland, Oregon
 Everybody Eats PDX, Portland, Oregon
 Le Bistro Montage, Portland, Oregon
 Nacheaux, West Linn, Oregon (previously Portland, Oregon)
 Tapalaya, Portland, Oregon
 The Parish, Portland, Oregon
 Upperline Restaurant

References

 
Lists of ethnic restaurants